Nikolai Vasilevich Novikov (7 February 1903 – 1989) was a Soviet diplomat born in Saint Petersburg.

Biography
He graduated from the Oriental Institute in St. Petersburg in 1930. In the following years, he held various scientific and academic positions, also serving in the Foreign Office in Moscow and Soviet representative in Cairo during World War II. Most notably, he served as ambassador of the Soviet Union to the United States, being named to that post on 10 April 1946 until he was relieved of his duties on 24 October 1947; he had been away from Washington since being recalled to Moscow for consultations on 26 July that year.

Novikov and his wife had two sons, Yuri (b. 1939) and Nikolai (b. 1943).

In 1990, during Glasnost, some of Novikov's papers from 1946 were released; 
This revealed the influential "Novikov telegram" or "Novikov report" which was, in part, a reaction to the highly critical telegram of George Kennan (Joseph Stalin and Vyacheslav Molotov were among the audience of this "top secret" article.)

References
Book review of Origins Of The Cold War: The Novikov, Kennan, And Roberts 'Long Telegrams' Of 1946, from Foreign Affairs
"Novikov Telegram" https://www.mtholyoke.edu/acad/intrel/novikov.htm

1903 births
1989 deaths
Diplomats from Saint Petersburg
Ambassadors of the Soviet Union to the United States
Ambassadors of the Soviet Union to Egypt
Ambassadors of the Soviet Union to Greece
Ambassadors of the Soviet Union to Yugoslavia

Institute of Red Professors alumni